Another Fine Mess is a 1930 short comedy film starring Laurel and Hardy.

Another Fine Mess may also refer to:

Music

Albums
 Another Fine Mess (Back Door album), 1975
 Another Fine Mess (Skyclad album) or the 1995 title song (see below), 2001
 Another Fine Mess, by the Allniters, 2000
 Another Fine Mess, by Chesney Hawkes, or the 2005 title song, 2007
 Another Fine Mess, by Lindisfarne, 1995
 Another Fine Mess, a series of house/club albums released by Azuli Records

Songs
 "Another Fine Mess", by Glen Campbell, 1978
 "Another Fine Mess", by Skyclad from The Silent Whales of Lunar Sea, 1995

Other media 
 Another Fine Mess: 80 Years of Laurel and Hardy, a 2006 UK radio programme produced by Ashley Byrne
 "Another Fine Mess", an episode of the TV series Seven of One

See also 
 Another Nice Mess, a 1972 comedy film by Bob Einstein
 Clearly in Another Fine Mess, a 2006 album by illScarlett
 A Fine Mess (disambiguation)